Haven is an English surname. Notable people with the surname include:

 Annette Haven (born 1954), American feminist
 Erastus Otis Haven (1820–1881), American bishop
 George G. Haven, Jr. (1866–1925), American businessman
 Gilbert Haven (1821-1880), American clergyman, Methodist Episcopal bishop
 James Haven (born 1973), American actor and director
 Jens Haven (1724–1796), Moravian missionary
 Martin Haven, British auto racing commentator
 Nathaniel Appleton Haven (1762–1831), American politician, U.S. Representative from New Hampshire
 Samuel Foster Haven (1806–1881), American archeologist and anthropologist
 Samuel Haven, American judge
 Jason Haven, American minister
 Solomon G. Haven (1810–1861), American politician, U.S. Representative from New York

See also
 Havens (disambiguation)
 Havers (disambiguation)